Satanic Reasons... is a best-of compilation by Leaether Strip.

Track listing
 Japanese Bodies (12" Version)
 Leæther Strip Part II
 Break My Back
 Fit For Flogging
 AntiUS
 Nose Candy
 Steal
 Mortal Thoughts
 Strap Me Down
 Nothing Seen - Nothing Done
 Evil Speaks
 Adrenalin Rush
 Turn To Stone
 Don't Tame Your Soul
 Torture (A Suicide Note)
 Down There With You
 No Rest For The Wicked
 You Know Where To Put It
 Lies To Tell
 How Do I Know?
 I Want You Hard
 Make My Blood Boil
 Hate Me!
 Black Candle!
 Face The Fire
 Tell Me What To Do!
 Under My Control
 Showroom Dummies
 Desert Storm
 I Wanna Fuck Now!

2005 greatest hits albums
Leæther Strip compilation albums